Prisme (released 1996 by the Norwegian Grappa label - GRCD 4113 / 18 Mar 1997 by US label Shanachie Records – 64082) is a studio album by Annbjørg Lien.

Review 
On her third international solo album Lien goes new ways in relation to the musical tradition she carries. The traditional costume is left at home, and Prism is recorded with jeans on. The result is a typically un-Norwegian and Swedish sounding album, where Lien expands her horizons creating traditional folk music fused with modern instrumentation like percussion and electronic instruments, in addition to the classic wind and string instruments as we know from the Nordic traditional music.

Reception
The Allmusic review awarded the album 4 stars, and the review by Anders Grønneberg of the Norwegian newspaper Dagbladet awarded the album dice 5.

Track listing 
«Villvinter» / «Wild Winter» (2:53) (Traditional)
«Fønix» / «Phoenix» (4:08)
«Cantabile» (3:59) (Traditional / Tone Hulbækmo)
«Luseblus» / «Lice Blues» (3:34)
«Vidvandre» / «Wandering» (4:02)
«Aprilbarnet» / «Child Of April» (3:24)
«Korstog» / «Crusade» (4:35)
«Hauk» (4:00)
«Prisme» (5:12)
«Fløteren» / «The Log Driver» (4:12)
«Galadriel» (3:56)
«Valhalling» (3:27)
«Ringen» / «The Ring» (3:33)

Personnel 
Annbjørg Lien – Hardingfele & fiddle
Bjørn Ole Rasch – keyboards, piano, organ & sampler
Roger Tallroth – guitar, mandolin & bouzouki
Hans Fredrik Jacobsen – flute, kantele & bagpipes
Mikael Marin – viola
Rune Arnesen – percussion

Credits 
Producer – Annbjørg Lien
Producer & arranger – Bjørn Ole Rasch
Morten Lund - mastering
Recording & mixing – Trond Engebretsen
Composer – Annbjørg Lien (tracks: 2 & 4-13)
Composer – Bjørn Ole Rasch (tracks: 1-2, 7 & 10-11)

References 

Annbjørg Lien albums
1996 albums